Environmental issues in Yemen are abundant and are divided into the categories of land and water. In the aspect of water, Yemen has limited natural fresh water resources and inadequate supplies of potable water. As for the land, two main issues of Yemen are overgrazing and desertification. Yemen has signed several international agreements: Climate Change-Kyoto Protocol, Desertification, Endangered Species, Environmental Modification, Hazardous Wastes, Law of the Sea, and Ozone Layer Protection.

Overview of geology 
 
Yemen maintains diverse landscapes of mountains, plains, and deserts. There is narrow coastal plain backed by flat-topped hills and rugged mountains; and dissected upland desert plains in center slope into the desert interior of the Arabian Peninsula. 
Forests covering the highlands are eliminated due to increasingly overgrazing and logging. Yemen covers 203,849 square miles (527,970 square kilometers) including 112 islands and 0 square kilometers of open water. The climate of Yemen is mostly desert weather. It is hot and humid along the coastal sections. Hot, dry and harsh desert in the east. Climate in the western mountains is affected by seasonal monsoons. Average Daily Temperatures in January: 13.9 °C/57 °F; in July: 21.7 °C/71 °F. Average annual rainfall in Yemen is 508mm/20".

Water issues 
Water issues in Yemen are based on two aspects, water shortage and water quality.

Water shortage 
Yemen has suffered from chronic water shortages owing to its climate, years of water mismanagement, and population growth. The capital Sana’a is at risk of running out of water as soon as 2017 while an estimated 84% of the population in the southern governorate of Al Dhale’e struggle daily to find or buy enough clean water to drink, cook, and grow food.

Each Yemeni only has access to about 140cu.m. of water per year for all uses on average. Excluding its coastal waters, Yemen has no permanent body of open water.

The vast majority of the water in Yemen, as much as 90 percent, goes to small-scale farming, at a time when agriculture contributes only 6 percent of GDP. The introduction of deep tube wells led to a drastic expansion of land under cultivation. In the period from 1970 to 2004, the irrigated area increased tenfold, from 37,000 to 407,000 hectares, 40 percent of which was supplied by deep groundwater aquifers. Farmers began growing less of the local, drought-resistant varieties of wheat and more water-intensive cash crops such as citrus and bananas.

Water quality 
Degraded water supply infrastructure is a significant factor in Yemen's current water scarcity. Community water sources were overburdened or dysfunctional before the crisis, and have endured conflict-related damage and further strain due to the influx of IDPs.
Bacterial diarrhea, hepatitis A and typhoid fever are leading illnesses in Yemen. More than 30,000 Yemenis, suffer from acute watery diarrhea in 2011 alone. Lack of access to improved water supply is responsible for the spread of water-borne diseases. Study of surface water and ground water in Yemen shows that the upstream site of surface water contains high concentration physico-chemical parameters. Leachate composition at Ibb landfill is very dangerous for polluting the groundwater, surface water and soil. All tested parameters except Ni and Cr in Ibb landfill leachate exceed the permissible limit required for treated wastewater discharge determined by Yemen's Ministry of Water and Environment (1999).

Reform 
The reform program in Yemen is on track and is beginning to take effect. Reforms in urban water and sanitation started more than a decade ago. Network coverage has expanded rapidly, and service standards have improved whilst costs for most connected consumers remain highly affordable. In 1997, Cabinet Resolution 237 was issued which embraced a policy of decentralization, corporatization, commercialization, separation of service delivery and regulatory function. Established partnership with the private sector increases efficiency, improves service delivery and ultimately reduces the cost burden on government. These reforms have been incorporated into the national water strategy (NWSSIP, 2004) and into the update of the strategy currently being prepared.

Desertification 
There are about 6,800 square kilometers of irrigated land in Yemen (2008). Overgrazing of pastureland is endemic. Soil erosion and desertification are also hazards in Yemen. Agricultural lands in Yemen are subject to various degrees of degradation and decline of soil productivity. Desertification largely threatens the natural resource-base.
Desertification is best expressed by the loss of land productivity, following mining of a resource. Monoculture in the absence of any farm inputs or rotations and erroneous farming practices constitute common features of Yemeni agriculture, which contribute greatly to the decline of agricultural yields and ultimately to desertification through loss of the resource productivity potential. Any reduction of the agricultural sector's importance in the national economy, will result in reduction of the national income and eventually affect the pace of development of the country. Main physical aspects of desertification are reduction in woodland, mangrove biomass and in species diversity, and depletion in groundwater.
A number of planning frameworks related to rural development and natural resource conservation were developed. United Nations Convention to Combat Desertification (UNCCD) is determined to implement the convention's main objectives of combating desertification and mitigating the effects of drought in order to achieve sustainable development. The United Nations Conference on Environment and Development (UNCED) has created many tools for the management, conservation, and sustainable development of natural resources.

Air Pollution 
As of 2017, Yemen was one of only 3 countries in the world with widespread use of leaded engine gasoline for automobiles, the others being Algeria and Iraq. Concerns over the toxicity of lead led to a ban on leaded automobile gasoline in most countries prior to 2011.

Sustainable development 
The Yemeni Government is facing challenging difficulties in many directions including severe water shortage, declining oil reserves, and succession questions. National Assessment of Sustainable Development in Yemen aims to highlight the integration of the social dimension and environmental interest in development planning, illustrating the Millennium Development Goals (MDGs) and setting the sustainable development priorities beyond 2015. Sustainable development is achieved on the basis of three fundamental pillars: economic growth, social development, and rationalization use of natural resources. The MDGs established measurable and universally-agreed objectives for eradicating extreme poverty and hunger, preventing deadly but treatable disease, and expanding educational opportunities to all children. The MDGs drove progress in several important areas: income poverty, access to improved sources of water, primary school enrollment and child mortality.
During many decades and via the support of international approaches, consecutive Yemeni governments adopted a number of initiatives and put great efforts. The following are most important ones:
 Poverty Reduction Strategy 2003-2005 is the cornerstone of intervention to combat poverty. It consists of five axes: achieving economic growth, increasing employment opportunities, developing infrastructure, providing a better level of basic social services, establishing an effective social safety net for the poor and drafting a mechanism for encouraging participation and cooperation. This strategy achieved positive outcomes, in which poverty rate decreased from 40.1% in 1998 to 34.8% 2005/2006 (indicated in HBS). Other national strategies focus on combating poverty include Food Security 2010, Agricultural Sector 2012, Fishery Sector 2012, Water 2013, and Environmental Sustainability 2007. Yemen's Strategic Vision 2025 is aimed at placing Yemen by 2025, among the countries of inclusion moderate human development with economic diversification and social, scientific, cultural and political development. 
 Economic and Social Development Plans for Poverty Reduction aimed at achieving development and reducing poverty. The fifth-year plans adopted a set of policies and programs to achieve the following: expanding the social safety net and developing its targeting mechanism, empowering economically the poor by promoting small projects and micro finance programs, giving priorities to labor-intensive investments in all sectors, particularly agriculture with a focus on rural areas. 
 Yemen's Transitional Program for Stabilization and Development(TPSD), by the light of exceptional conditions and via donors’ support, aimed to continue the exerted efforts at combating poverty, particularly in rural areas, expanding the social protection umbrella for the sake of alleviating the adverse impacts of the deteriorating economic conditions, and promoting food security on the basis of local agricultural productivity. The urgent humanitarian needs have been estimated at $2,136 million, including aid to the displaced. 
 CNDD, specifically the axis of Sustainable Development, which contained 12 special resolutions, concerning food security, social protection and malnutrition combat. This concern emerged in the light of adopting a system of “Free Social Economy” or Social Market Economy in order to ensure the balance between market economy and social equality within economic relations, develop productivity, realize social integration, equalize opportunities, and upgrade the living standards of the people.

References 

Environment of Yemen